Kara Stone (born 1989) is an independent Canadian video game designer, artist, and academic.

Stone has produced a number of notable independent games over the course of her career, including Medication Mediation, Sext Adventure, and Ritual of the Moon. Her work largely focuses on the intersection of game design, disability, and gender. She is also a member of the Different Games collective.

Early life
Stone was born and raised in Toronto, Canada. She is a graduate of Etobicoke School of the Arts and holds both a BFA in Film Production and an MA in Communication and Culture from York University. She has a Ph.D in Film & Digital Media from the University of California, Santa Cruz and is an assistant professor at the Alberta University of the Arts in Calgary.

Career
Stone's earliest artworks were not in the medium of video games. One notable early work, 2012's Polaroid Panic, consisted of Polaroid photos Stone would capture of her face whenever she experienced a panic attack. Stone's first significant games work came two years later, with Medication Meditation, published in collaboration with Dames Making Games. Medication Meditation consists of an "unwinnable compilation of activities", each of which reflecting an experience associated with living with mental illness. The game was well-received, and saw favorable coverage in outlets such as Kill Screen and The Atlantic.

That same year, Stone released one of her most popular games, Sext Adventure, written by Stone and developed by Nadine Lessio. In Sext Adventure, the player has a sexual encounter with a fictional robot via text message (later expanded to web browsers), that eventually subverts and challenges traditional notions of what a "sexting" conversation looks like. While the game begins like a normal sexting conversation (including real nudity) eventually the sexting robot becomes "confused" and begins to produce errors, including mistaking its own presumed gender and the gender of the player. The game concludes in one of twenty different endings.

Another major release by Stone is 2019's Ritual of the Moon. Over the course of 28 real-time days, Ritual of the Moon slowly unveils the narrative of a witch who has been exiled to the moon. The art style of the game is composed entirely of scanned and digitally manipulated images. Many reviews focused on the unique 28-day structure of the game, including a full 28-day series on RockPaperShotgun.

Stone's most recent work is UnearthU, which was released in 2021. Seemingly a straightforward wellness app, UnearthU gradually reveals a complex narrative that critically interrogates mindfulness, wellness, and the Silicon Valley tech industry.

Works

Video games

Selected publications 
 Stone, Kara (2018). “Time and Reparative Game Design.” Game Studies: The International Journal of Computer Game Research. Vol 18, 3. December 2018. http://gamestudies.org/1803/articles/stone
 Stone, Kara (2019). “What Can Play: The Potential of Non-Human Players”. Pivot: A Journal of Interdisciplinary Study and Thought. Vol 7 No 1 (2019): Muddied Waters: Decomposing the Anthropocene. https://pivot.journals.yorku.ca/index.php/pivot/article/view/40291

External links
karastonesite, Stone's personal website
Kara Stone at Twitter

References

Canadian video game designers
Indie video game developers
Living people
1989 births
Women video game designers